Eden Shrem (born March 9, 1993) is an Israeli footballer who currently plays at Hapoel Marmorek.

Early life
Shrem was born in Rishon LeZion, Israel, to a Jewish family.

Career
Shrem grew up in the youth department of Hapoel Tel Aviv and in season 2011/2012 scored 16 in 33 games in the youth team. 
At the end of that season he was playing first team uniforms.

Clubs career statistics
As to 17 July 2014

Notes

1993 births
Living people
Israeli Jews
Israeli footballers
Hapoel Tel Aviv F.C. players
Hapoel Rishon LeZion F.C. players
Beitar Tel Aviv Bat Yam F.C. players
Maccabi Netanya F.C. players
Maccabi Petah Tikva F.C. players
Hapoel Katamon Jerusalem F.C. players
Sektzia Ness Ziona F.C. players
F.C. Kafr Qasim players
Maccabi Ironi Ashdod F.C. players
Hapoel Marmorek F.C. players
Israeli Premier League players
Liga Leumit players
Footballers from Rishon LeZion
Association football forwards